AOW may refer to:
 Act of War: Direct Action, a real-time strategy video game
 Act of War: High Treason, an expansion pack for Act of War: Direct Action
 Advanced Open Water, a scuba diving training level common to many certification agencies
 Algemene Ouderdomswet, a Dutch pension act
 Age of Wonders, a turn-based strategy PC game
 Any Other Weapon, a weapons classification in the United States National Firearms Act
 Age of Wulin, a free-to-play Wuxia MMORPG published by Gala Networks Europe
 Art of Wrestling, a pro wrestling radio show by Colt Cabana
 Autostradowa Obwodnica Wrocławia, Wrocław motorway bypass in Poland